T54 may refer to:

 T54 (classification), a classification in disability athletics
 T54 (American tank), a series of prototype American tanks of the 1950s
 T-54, a series of main battle tanks designed in the Soviet Union
 T54 (road), the former designation of a road in Ireland running between Carrick on Shannon and Bundoran